Silenen is a municipality in the canton of Uri in Switzerland.

Geography

Silenen municipality comprises the villages of Silenen (divided into three parts, Dörfli, Russ, Rusli), Amsteg, and Acherli, besides numerous smaller hamlets or dispersed settlements, including Schützen, Buechholz, Öfibach,  Dägerlohn, Frentschenberg,  Ried (Vorderried, Hinterried), Maderanerthal valley (St. Anton = Vorderbristen,  Bristen = Hinterbristen, Cholplatz, Hälteli, Steinmatte, Schattigmatt etc.), Hofstetten, Silblen, and the Golzeren plateau (Egg, Hüseren, Seewen, etc.)

Of this area, 12.8% is used for agricultural purposes (mostly alpine pastures), while 18.3% is forested. Of the rest of the land, 0.7% is settled (buildings or roads) and the remainder (68.1%) is non-productive (mostly mountainous).

Arnisee can be reached by gondola lift from Amsteg.

The Zwing Uri Castle, overlooking Amsteg has some importance in  Swiss historiography as the first fortress destroyed in the Burgenbruch at the beginning of the Swiss Confederacy.

Demographics
, 11.7% of the population was made up of foreign nationals. Over the last 10 years the population has grown at a rate of 4.5%. Most of the population speaks German  (98.1%), with Italian being second most common ( 0.2%) and Serbo-Croatian being third ( 0.2%).   the gender distribution of the population was 55.3% male and 44.7% female.

In the 2007 federal election the FDP party received 87.4% of the vote.

In Silenen about 52.8% of the population (between age 25-64) have completed either non-mandatory upper secondary education or additional higher education (either university or a Fachhochschule).

Silenen has an unemployment rate of 1.22%.  , there were 141 people employed in the primary economic sector and about 60 businesses involved in this sector.  117 people are employed in the secondary sector and there are 16 businesses in this sector.  241 people are employed in the tertiary sector, with 50 businesses in this sector.

The historical population is given in the following table:

References

Municipalities of the canton of Uri